The Fire Support Vehicle (FSV) of the Stryker series provides automated enhanced surveillance, target acquisition, target identification, target tracking, target designation, position location and communications functionality. Targets will be transmitted instantly to the fire support system and shooter. Models with the double V-hull upgrade are known as the M1251 FSVV.

General
The FSV provides enhanced surveillance, target acquisition, target identification, target designation, and communications supporting the SBCT with ”first round“ fire-for-effect capability. It integrates the current M707 Striker Mission Equipment Package. The FSV provides the Fire Support Teams (FIST) with the capability to automate command and control functions, to perform fire support planning, directing, controlling and cross-functional area coordination, and execution.

Operational Capability
The FSV is based on the ICV due to the close parallels of operational requirements between the two vehicles. The FSV is an organic vehicle to the ICV maneuver formation and helps maximize commonality of the platform while simultaneously reducing the maintenance footprint and variety of logistics support.

Four combat radio nets (Co Cmd, Mortar Plt, FECC, Fires 1-4) allow secure voice and digital communications with, Initial Fire Support Automation System (IFSAS) or Advanced Field Artillery Tactical Data System (AFATDS), the maneuver command communications, and other fire support assets. FBCB2 is required for situation awareness and maneuver force communications in distributed operations and on the non-linear battlespace.

A vehicular intercom system (VIS) that enables communication on each of the four combat radio nets from each crew positions is required in the MAV-FSV. The VIS permits each of the operating stations to selectively monitor the intercommunications system and any combination of four radio receivers, while selectively transmitting on any of the radio transmitters in addition to the intercommunications system.

FS MAV must be capable of hosting the hand-held terminal unit and tactical radios for transmission of digital targeting and fire support data. Targeting data must be passed automatically to provide timely, error-free targeting information through digital means, to include spot reports providing updated situational awareness. Digital communications is required to all fire support assets to forward targeting data to the attack platforms without causing the platform operators to transcribe information and to allow for the automated processing of target, clearance, and firing data. The capability to communicate with all joint fire support assets allows the full utilization of the attack capabilities available.

MEHEL
Since the M1131 Fire Support Vehicle is designed for target tracking and identification, the Army is integrating a directed energy weapon onto the version, called the Mobile Expeditionary High Energy Laser (MEHEL), to defend against small and medium unmanned aerial vehicles (UAVs).  The laser was tested at 2 kW in April 2016, and a 5 kW version became operational in 2017, with plans to increase power to 18 kW by 2018.

Sources
This article incorporates work from https://web.archive.org/web/20080516205911/http://www.sbct.army.mil/product_fsv.html, which is in the public domain as it is a work of the United States Military.

See also
 List of U.S. military vehicles by model number

References

Fire support vehicles
Wheeled reconnaissance vehicles
Wheeled armoured fighting vehicles
Post–Cold War armored fighting vehicles of the United States
General Dynamics land vehicles
Mowag Piranha